Papyrus 60 (in the Gregory-Aland numbering), signed by 𝔓60, is a copy of the New Testament in Greek.  It is a papyrus manuscript of the Gospel of John, it contains John 16:29-19:26.

The manuscript paleographically has been assigned to the sixth or seventh century.

The Greek text of this codex is a representative of the Alexandrian text-type. Aland placed it in Category III.

It is currently housed at The Morgan Library & Museum (P. Colt 4) in New York City.

See also 
 List of New Testament papyri

References

Further reading 
 L. Casson, and E.L. Hettich, Excavations at Nessana II, Literary Papyri (Princeton: 1946), pp. 94–111.

New Testament papyri
7th-century biblical manuscripts
Collection of the Morgan Library & Museum
Gospel of John papyri